"Expose" 」（エクスポーズ） is the 20th single by Japanese boy band KAT-TUN. The song "Expose" is the theme song for the Suzuki Solio Bandit TV-CM. The single was to have included the CM songs for Suzuki's 'Solio', "Steps to Love", "Brand New Day", and "Connect & Go".

Single information
Regular edition includes two new songs and their instrumental versions. Limited Editions 1 includes "Steps to Love" and "Brand New Day" as B-side songs and comes with a DVD including a promotion video and as well as an original video produced by Yuichi Nakamaru. Limited Editions 2 includes "Connect & Go" as the B-side. Comes with a DVD including a promotion video for "Connect & Go" as well as the music video for Yuichi Nakamaru's solo song. Jacket designs are different between Limited Editions and regular edition.

Chart performance
In its first week of its release, the single topped the Oricon singles chart, reportedly selling 154,710 copies. With this single, their number of consecutive singles topping the chart has reached 20, as they've been topping the chart since their debut single “Real Face” (released in March 2006). KAT-TUN is the second artist (including both male/female and solo/group) to top the single chart for 20 consecutive singles since the debut. It was only achieved by their senior KinKi Kids 8 years and a month ago with “Anniversary” (released in December 2004). KinKi Kids is still renewing their record, and their number is now 32 consecutive singles since their debut single “Glass no Shounen” (released in July 1997). KAT-TUN placed at no.8 in the second weeks, reportedly selling 10,998 copies and in the third weeks of its release the single placed at no.23, reportedly selling 3,265 copies.

By the end of the year, Expose was reported by Oricon to sell 173,400 copies and was later certified Gold by RIAJ denoting over 100,000 shipments.

Track listing

Chart

References

External links
 Expose product information

KAT-TUN songs
2013 singles
Japanese television drama theme songs
Oricon Weekly number-one singles
2013 songs